Juli Soler (31 May 1949 – 6 July 2015) was an entrepreneur from Spain. He was the co-owner and manager of elBulli, a world famous restaurant outside of Barcelona.

Early life and career
Soler began working in the food industry at the age of 13, as an assistant waiter. In 1981, he was offered the position as a general manager at elBulli. He was largely responsible for the success of elBulli. He was responsible for hiring French chef, Jean-Paul Vinay who eventually helped the restaurant to gain its second Michelin star. In 1984, he also hired Ferran Adrià as chef, who later went on to become a celebrity chef and author. In 1990, Soler and Adrià became business partners and bought elBulli.

He died of degenerative nerve disease in 2015, at the age of 66.

References

Spanish businesspeople
2015 deaths
1949 births